Pseudopostega divaricata is a moth of the family Opostegidae. It was described by Donald R. Davis and Jonas R. Stonis, 2007. It is known from northern Argentina.

The length of the forewings is 3.5–4.8 mm. Adults have been recorded in January and November.

Etymology
The species name is derived from the Latin divaricatus (meaning spread apart) in reference to the greatly divergent, furcate apex of the male gnathos.

References

Opostegidae
Moths described in 2007